Draw the Line is the eighth studio album by English singer-songwriter David Gray, released on 14 September 2009 in Europe and 22 September in the United States. The first single "Fugitive" was released on 7 September 2009. The second single, a duet with Annie Lennox, "Full Steam", released on 28 December 2009.

Album information
Gray recorded the album, his first set of new songs since 2005's Life in Slow Motion, in his own studio—The Church Studios—while unsigned to a record label. The track, described as "a broad political thing," is one of two duets on the album. The second, "Kathleen," features Jolie Holland. Gray revealed in an interview that the original choice for "Kathleen" was Dolly Parton, to whom he wrote a letter with a demo of the song. Parton turned down the offer, as she was busy.

Draw the Line is the first studio album after Gray parted with longtime collaborator Craig McClune in 2007. Gray said that he felt "the creative spark was sort of diminishing between the people who were involved." The album includes 11 new songs, with a new band: Neill MacColl on guitar, Robbie Malone on bass and Keith Prior on drums. Gray told The Irish Times that these changes were part of the thinking behind the title: "It's the end of one thing and the start of another. Because there was a chapter and it's ended and now there's a new one. But also it's like, 'don't cross this line!' It's confrontational, which is intentional. That's how I feel."

A deluxe hardcover book edition of the album, featuring a booklet with 20 pages of illustrations and a bonus CD of tracks recorded live at The Roundhouse, was also released simultaneously.

Commercial performance
Draw the Line entered and peaked on the UK Album Chart at number five and charted for only five weeks, making it Gray's poorest performing release since The EPs 1992–1994 which charted for only one week. In Austria, it entered and peaked at number 74, charting for only one week.

In the United States, the album performed better on the Independent Albums chart, peaking at number 2 and charting for 20 weeks. The album also did better on the Swiss Music Charts, peaking at number 18 and charting for four weeks. Draw the Line also made it into the top 20 in other charts such as the ARIA Charts, peaking at number 18 and charting for 7 weeks. It also did well in New Zealand, peaking at number 15 and charting for 3 weeks.

Track listing

Personnel
 David Gray – vocals, piano, acoustic guitar, Wurlitzer, hi-strung, vox organ, vibraphone, harmonium
 Keith Prior – drums, percussion, b/v 's
 Rob Malone – bass, electric guitar, acoustic guitar, harmonium, b/v 's
 Neill Maccoll – electric guitar, acoustic guitar, mandolin, hi-strung, b/v 's
 Caroline Dale – cello
 Jolie Holland – vocals on track 5
 Annie Lennox – vocals on track 11
 Iestyn Polson – programming
 Simon Changer – mix engineer

Charts

Certifications

References

2009 albums
David Gray (musician) albums
2009 live albums
Albums produced by Iestyn Polson